Tillandsia subg. Phytarrhiza is a subgenus of the genus Tillandsia.

Species
Species accepted by Encyclopedia of Bromeliads as of October 2022:

Tillandsia arhiza 
Tillandsia aurea 
Tillandsia cacticola 
Tillandsia caerulea 
Tillandsia duratii 
Tillandsia graomogolensis 
Tillandsia humilis 
Tillandsia itatiensis 
Tillandsia jequiensis 
Tillandsia kirschnekii 
Tillandsia linearis 
Tillandsia mallemontii 
Tillandsia mandonii 
Tillandsia marconae 
Tillandsia paleacea 
Tillandsia peiranoi 
Tillandsia purpurea 
Tillandsia reichenbachii 
Tillandsia santiagoensis 
Tillandsia straminea 
Tillandsia streptocarpa

References

Plant subgenera
Phytarrhiza